This is a list of mosques in Spain. It lists Muslim mosques (Arabic: Masjid, Spanish: Mezquita) and Islamic centers in Spain. It list only open, functioning mosques that allow Muslims to perform Islamic prayers (Salah). For a list of old historical mosques built during Al-Andalus (Muslim Spain) period, please see the list of former mosques in Spain.

The exact number of mosques in Spain vary according to different sources and estimates. As of May 2018, El Observatorio del Pluralismo Religioso en España (Observatory of Religious Pluralism in Spain) listed 1588 places of Muslim worship on their website. According to a former 2010 estimate, there were 13 large mosques and more than 1000 smaller mosques and Islamic prayer rooms scattered across the country serving an estimated Muslim population of 1.5 million. The majority of them were located in Catalonia in northeastern Spain.

The number of mosques has been increasing with the growth of Islam in Spain, resulting mainly from immigration from Muslim countries, and increasing number of Muslim tourists visiting the country. However finding a mosque or prayer facility is still difficult in many places outside major cities and towns.

List of mosques in Spain
This is a list of open, functioning mosques only. It list some, but by no means all of the active mosques in Spain. But it does not include historic former mosques in Spain like the Mosque–Cathedral of Córdoba that do not allow Islamic prayers on their premises.

See also
 Islam in Spain
 Religion in Spain
 List of former mosques in Spain
 Lists of mosques (worldwide)

References 

Islam in Spain
Spain
Mosques